The Stork Club is a 1945 American musical comedy film directed by Hal Walker and starring Betty Hutton.

Plot summary
Judy Peabody (Betty Hutton) is a hat-check girl at New York's popular Stork Club nightclub. Her dreams are for her bandleader boyfriend Danny (Don DeFore) to return home from the Marines, and to sing with his band.

While sunbathing on a dock, Judy saves an elderly man (Barry Fitzgerald) from drowning. She assumes from his disheveled appearance and folksy demeanor that he is poor, and calls him "Pop". She gives him her name and tells him where she works, and encourages him to contact her if he ever needs help again.

Unbeknownst to her, the man is the wealthy Jerry Bates, whom his lawyer Curtis (Robert Benchley) refers to as "J.B." Bates instructs Curtis to anonymously reward Judy with everything her heart desires. Curtis sends a letter to Judy at the Stork Club, informing her she now has a new luxury apartment, and a line of credit at a prestigious department store, with no strings attached.

Bates, donning shabby clothes to conceal his wealth, visits Judy at the club. Assuming he is unemployed, she convinces the maitre d' to hire him as a busboy, a position Bates quickly sabotages.

Bates returns to the club to see Judy receive the letter. She promptly goes on a shopping spree, buying dresses and furs without knowing her benefactor's identity.

Assuming Bates is homeless, Judy offers him a room in her new apartment—and Bates, who has formed a fatherly attachment to her, and whose wife has recently left him, accepts.

Danny arrives home with plans to form a new band of top-flight musicians. He is excited to see Judy, until he sees her luxurious apartment and clothes and suspects she has become a "kept woman" in his absence. When he sees Bates at Judy's apartment, he believes his suspicions have been confirmed and breaks up with her.

When Danny finds out Judy has rented the other apartment on her floor for his band, he becomes cool to her. Judy continues to invest in Danny's band by buying new clothes for them using Bates' money. Bates is upset and wants to rein in her spending and asks his lawyer Curtis to tell her who he is. Curtis refuses, but Bates catches Curtis in the hallway to tell Curtis he works for him. Curtis begins to tell him he won't lose much, about $200,000 to $300,000, and not to mention the Gift Tax of 30% of any gift over $3,000. Bates replies, "Coolidge. Oh, for a Coolidge" harking back to days of the Roaring Twenties when President Calvin Coolidge cut both taxes and federal spending to boost America's economy.

Danny meets with an agent but has trouble finding work for his new band. Judy phones Sherman Billingsley (Bill Goodwin), the Stork Club's powerful but generous owner, and posing as gossip columnist Walter Winchell, tells him about a fantastic new band he must hear. Billingsley arrives at the apartment, where Danny's tuxedoed band and Judy perform brilliantly for him. Billingsley offers them a job at the club, then tells Judy: "By the way, I'd know your voice anywhere—and I was having lunch with Winchell when you called."

When Judy meets Bates's estranged wife, she finally learns that Bates is responsible for her new riches. Seeking to return his kindness, she engineers a reconciliation between them.

Meanwhile, Danny confronts Curtis and learns the truth about Judy's benefactor. Realizing she has been true to him, Danny apologizes to her—on the bandstand, during a song—and they are reunited.

Cast
(in credits order)
 Betty Hutton as Judy Peabody
 Barry Fitzgerald as Jerry B. "J.B."/"Pop" Bates
 Don DeFore as Sgt. Danny Wilton
 Robert Benchley as Tom P. Curtis
 Bill Goodwin as Sherman Billingsley
 Iris Adrian as Gwen
 Mikhail Rasumny as Mr. Coretti
 Mary Young as Mrs. Edith Bates
 Andy Russell as Jimmy 'Jim' Jones
(partial remaining cast, in alphabetic order)
 Jean Acker as Dress Saleslady (uncredited)
 Sam Ash as Ringsider (uncredited)
 Mae Busch as Vera (uncredited)
 Anthony Caruso Joe – Fisherman (uncredited) 
 Charles Coleman as MacFiske (uncredited)
 Catherine Craig as Louella Parsons (uncredited)
 Franklyn Farnum as Nightclub Diner (uncredited)
 William Haade as Army Sergeant Dancing with Judy (uncredited)
 Noel Neill as Jacqueline Billingsley (uncredited)
 William Newell as Higgins – Judy's Chauffeur (uncredited)
 Elaine Riley as Deb (uncredited)
 Grady Sutton as Peter – Salesman (uncredited)
 Pierre Watkin as Mr. Gray (uncredited)
 Audrey Young as Jenny (uncredited)

Soundtrack
 Andy Russell – "Love Me" (Music by Jule Styne, Lyrics by Sammy Cahn)
 Betty Hutton – "Doctor, Lawyer, Indian Chief" (Music by Hoagy Carmichael, Lyrics by Paul Francis Webster)
 Betty Hutton and Andy Russell – "If I Had A Dozen Hearts" (Music by Harry Revel, Lyrics by Paul Francis Webster)
 Betty Hutton – "I'm a Square in the Social Circle" (Music and lyrics by Jay Livingston and Ray Evans)
 Betty Hutton – "In the Shade of the Old Apple Tree" (Music by Egbert Van Alstyne, Lyrics by Harry Williams)
 The band – "In the Shade of the Old Apple Tree"
 Barry Fitzgerald and Mary Young – "In the Shade of the Old Apple Tree"

References

External links 
 
 
 
 
 

1945 films
1945 romantic comedy films
1945 musical comedy films
Films directed by Hal Walker
Films scored by Robert Emmett Dolan
American black-and-white films
Paramount Pictures films
American romantic musical films
1940s romantic musical films
American musical comedy films
American romantic comedy films
1940s English-language films
1940s American films